Brother Martin: Servant of Jesus (1942) is a race film written and directed by Spencer Williams. The film was produced in Tulsa, Oklahoma, on the grounds of St. Monica Catholic Church. It featured an all-black cast and was produced exclusively for exhibition in U.S. cinemas serving African American communities. It was among a number of religious-themed feature films created by Williams during the 1940s, who also wrote and directed The Blood of Jesus (1941) and Go Down, Death! (1944).

Preservation status
No archive or private collection is known to have a print of Brother Martin: Servant of Jesus, and it is now believed to be a lost film.

See also
List of lost films

References

External links 
 

1942 films
Race films
Lost American films
Films directed by Spencer Williams
Films about Christianity
1942 drama films
American drama films
American black-and-white films
1940s lost films
Lost drama films
1940s American films
Films shot in Oklahoma